John Weaver (died March 1685) was an English politician who sat in the House of Commons at various times between 1645 and 1659. He supported the Parliamentarian side in the Civil War

Weaver was of North Luffenham, Rutland, and was admitted a freeman of Stamford, Lincolnshire on 25 October 1631. From 1643 to 1644 he was judge-advocate to the army of the Earl of Manchester.  In 1645, Weaver was elected as Member of Parliament (MP) for Stamford for the Long Parliament.  He became one of the recognised leaders of the Independents and remained in the House of Commons after Pride's Purge, although he refused to sit as one of the judges in the trial of King Charles I. From 1650 to 1653 he was one of  the Commissioners for the government of Ireland. The officers of the Irish army petitioned for his removal on 18 February 1653 and on 22 February he was allowed to resign at his own request.

During the Commonwealth period, Weaver was elected MP for Stamford in 1654 for the First Protectorate Parliament, in 1656 for the Second Protectorate Parliament and in 1659 for the Third Protectorate Parliament.  In December 1659, Weaver helped  Anthony Ashley Cooper, 1st Earl of Shaftesbury and others in securing the Tower of London for the parliament, after the army had turned out the Long parliament. As a result, he became a member of the Council of State of 1659-1660. He stood for parliament at Stamford in 1660 for the Convention Parliament but the return was disputed and his election declared void.

Weaver died in 1685 and was buried at North Luffenham on 25 March 1685.

References

 * D. Brunton and D. H. Pennington, Members of the Long Parliament (London: George Allen & Unwin, 1954)
Cobbett's Parliamentary history of England, from the Norman Conquest in 1066 to the year 1803 (London: Thomas Hansard, 1808) 

 

1685 deaths
17th-century births
Roundheads
People from North Luffenham
English MPs 1640–1648
English MPs 1648–1653
English MPs 1654–1655
English MPs 1656–1658
English MPs 1659